Sheldon Young (born May 26, 1991), known professionally as Channel Tres, is an American rapper, singer and record producer from Compton, California. Tres is best known for his singles "Controller" and "Topdown".

Early life
Young grew up in southern Los Angeles, between Compton and Lynwood, and was raised by his great-grandparents. He spent most days at church, where he played drums for the choir. Channel left home to study music at a private Christian university in Tulsa, Oklahoma. Upon his return to Los Angeles, a childhood friend (88rising artist August 08) brought him along to studio sessions, where he rose to making beats for Duckwrth, Wale, Kehlani and others.

Career
Tres rose to international fame in 2018. "Controller" received major airplay on BBC Radio 1 and an Essential New Tune call-out from Pete Tong. Australian radio station Triple J added "Controller" to their A-list rotation and called it "one of 2018's biggest cult hits." Tres continued to see success with the release of his self-titled EP in 2018 and further singles, including his single "Black Moses", which featured JPEGMAFIA. He played his first headline shows in the US in 2019.

Discography

Extended plays

Singles

As lead artist

As featured artist

Other charted songs

Guest appearances

Remixes

References

External links
 

1991 births
21st-century American male musicians
African-American male rappers
Alternative hip hop musicians
Living people
Musicians from Compton, California
Rappers from Los Angeles
West Coast hip hop musicians
21st-century African-American musicians